The 2014–15 Weber State Wildcats men's basketball team represented Weber State University during the 2014–15 NCAA Division I men's basketball season. The Wildcats were led by ninth year head coach Randy Rahe and played their home games at the Dee Events Center. They were members of the Big Sky Conference. They finished the season 13–17, 8–10 in Big Sky play to finish in a tie for seventh place. They lost in the quarterfinals of the Big Sky tournament to Montana.

Roster

Schedule

|-
!colspan=9 style=| Exhibition

|-
!colspan=9 style=| Regular season

|-
!colspan=9 style=| Big Sky tournament

References

Weber State Wildcats men's basketball seasons
Weber State
Weber State Wildcats men's basketball
Weber State Wildcats men's basketball